Jenny Slew (1719 – after 1765) was one of the first black Americans to sue for her freedom, and the first person to succeed through trial by jury.

Biography

Early life 
Jenny Slew was born around 1719 to a free white woman, Betty Slew, and a man of African descent, likely a slave. Slew lived a life as a free woman in Ipswich, Massachusetts up until 1762.

Marriages 
Slew was married several times, all to enslaved men.

Kidnapping 
In January 1762, when Slew was forty-three, she was kidnapped from her home in Ipswich and forced into servitude by John Whipple Jr.

Slew vs. Whipple 
In 1765, three years after her kidnapping, Slew brought a suit to court. She demanded her freedom and 25 pounds in damages, charging Whipple with violating her liberty. Most colonies denied slaves the right to sue in court, but Massachusetts allowed slaves to bring forward civil suits, even though they would still be regarded as property. Furthermore, most civil suits were brought forward by men. Slew's attorney Benjamin Kent argued that her mother was a white and free woman, so she was free. In the colonies at the time, a child's legal status descended from a mother. Slew filed her complaint in the Inferior Court of Common Pleas in Newburyport which threw out her petition since she filed under the name "Jenny Slew, Spinster". The court argued that since she had been married, such a name was incorrect. Slew was charged with the expense of the suit.

A year later, Slew brought an appeal to the Essex Superior Court of Judicature in Salem, Massachusetts where she faced a trial by jury. The jury's members were composed of "white Gentlemen". Whipple argued that Slew could not prove that she was free and that he owned proof of sale for when he purchased her. He also argued that Slew also did not have any legal rights since she was married and thus under the rulings of her husband. However, Slew was not married during the time of the trials and her marriages had been to slaves. In all of the colonies at that time, the law did not legalize marriages between slaves. Thus, the Superior considered Slew a "spinster" and able to sue for her freedom. The superior court reversed the ruling by deciding that whether a child was a slave or not was determined by the mother's race.[2] Slew won her freedom and was awarded her court costs and four pounds in damages.

John Adams, future president of the United States, was most likely present at Slew's trial. Adams has records of the trial in his legal papers and according to one of his diary entries on November 5, 1766, Adams wrote about a trial of a "mulatto woman... suing for liberty" against a white man accused of kidnapping.

See also 
 Elizabeth Freeman

References 

1719 births
18th-century American slaves
18th-century African-American women
African-American abolitionists
People from Ipswich, Massachusetts
People of colonial Massachusetts
Kidnapped American people
Race legislation in the United States
United States slavery case law
Year of death missing